Presidential elections were held in the Dominican Republic on 16 May 2008. The result was a victory for incumbent President Leonel Fernández of the Dominican Liberation Party.

Opinion polls

Results

References

Dominican
Presidential election
Presidential elections in the Dominican Republic
May 2008 events in North America